Svatopluk Skarupský (born January 29, 1947) is a Czechoslovak sprint canoer who competed in the late 1960s. He was disqualified in the final of the C-2 1000 m event at the 1968 Summer Olympics in Mexico City for reasons not disclosed in the official report.

References
Sports-reference.com profile

1947 births
Canoeists at the 1968 Summer Olympics
Czechoslovak male canoeists
Living people
Olympic canoeists of Czechoslovakia